Season 2001–02 was a turbulent one for Hibernian, as the team had three different permanent managers during the season.  Alex McLeish left the club in December to manage Rangers; Hibs surprisingly replaced him with star player Franck Sauzée, who retired as a player when he was appointed manager. Sauzee's brief tenure saw a long winless run in the SPL and domestic cup defeats by Rangers and Ayr United. The winless run in the league dragged Hibs into the fringes of a relegation battle, and Sauzee was sacked after just 69 days in charge. Kilmarnock manager Bobby Williamson was hired as Sauzee's replacement, and a brief winning run averted any danger of relegation. Earlier in the season, Hibs had been knocked out of the UEFA Cup in the first round by AEK Athens, but only after a dramatic second leg at Easter Road that went to extra time.

League season 
Hibs began the 2001–02 league season in reasonable form, winning convincingly against Dunfermline Athletic and St Johnstone on successive Sundays in September. A poor run of one win in nine followed their elimination from the UEFA Cup, however, leaving Hibs in eighth place in the 12 team SPL. Nonetheless, manager Alex McLeish, who had guided Hibs to promotion back to the top flight in 1998–99, third place in 2000–01 and the 2001 Scottish Cup Final, was linked with the Rangers job when it was indicated that the incumbent, Dick Advocaat, would be moved to another role within that club. A few days later, McLeish was unveiled as Rangers manager, with Hibs and Rangers still negotiating over compensation. Donald Park managed the team on a caretaker basis for a 1–1 draw against Rangers the following day, and Franck Sauzee was swiftly appointed as manager two days later. Park was also promoted from the role of reserve team manager to assistant manager. BBC Sport commented:

Hibs were already on a poor run of form when Sauzee was appointed, and this was greatly extended during his time in charge. After just 69 days in the job, Sauzee was sacked by Hibs. Another factor appeared to be that the last place club, St Johnstone, had just won a game and reduced the gap between the clubs to nine points, with Hibs due to play the Perth club in their next game. Sauzee spoke to the media after his dismissal, insisting that he was not worried that Hibs may be relegated. Two days later, Hibs agreed a deal with Bobby Williamson to be the new manager, subject to compensation being agreed with Kilmarnock. In Williamson's first game in charge, the key match with St. Johnstone, Hibs won 3–0 and all but ensured their survival in the SPL. The result gave Hibs their first win in 19 SPL games, since an Edinburgh derby win in October. Despite the positive result, some of the Hibs supporters chanted Sauzee's name. The match reporter writing in The Observer reckoned that this was a sarcastic criticism of the Hibs board's decisions in hiring and then so quickly firing Sauzee. Further wins towards the end of the season meant that Hibs, although finishing in a lowly 10th, ended up 20 points ahead of St Johnstone.

Results

Final table

UEFA Cup 
Having finished third in the previous season's Scottish Premier League, Hibs entered the UEFA Cup at the first round stage. The first leg against AEK Athens was scheduled to be played on 13 September 2001, but this was postponed by UEFA in light of the terrorist attacks on 11 September. Given the lateness of the decision, many Hibs fans had already travelled to Greece and were left out of pocket without a match to attend. The team themselves were on the runway at Edinburgh Airport when the decision from UEFA was advised to them. UEFA announced later that day that the UEFA Cup games scheduled to be played on 13 September would instead be played on 20 September.

When the match was finally played, Hibs suffered a 2–0 defeat in the "disrespectful" atmosphere of the Nikos Goumas Stadium. The match reporter for The Scotsman observed that:

Hibs appeared to miss the "calming influence" of Franck Sauzee, who had been injured in the preceding league match. Although AEK created few chances in the early proceedings, a penalty kick early in the second half gave them the lead. A second goal from a header by Nikolaidis and the lack of an away goal left Hibs facing a "formidable challenge" to progress.

Sauzee returned for the second leg at Easter Road, while AEK made a few changes. Hibs had the early pressure but failed to score until the 53rd minute, when Paco Luna headed in from close range. Hibs then pressed to bring the aggregate score level at 2–2, but again lost Sauzee to injury with 10 minutes remaining. Nonetheless, Hibs were level a minute later, with Luna again scoring. Hibs then had a great chance to win the tie in the last minute of normal time, but Luna headed wide from a de la Cruz cross. With the aggregate score level and no away goals scored by either side, the tie headed into extra time. AEK regrouped during the break before the extra periods, and Tsiartas scored early on from long range. This left Hibs needing two goals without reply to win the tie, given the away goals rule. Tsiartas then added another goal for AEK from a corner, leaving Hibs with almost no chance to progress. David Zitelli then scored what was effectively a consolation goal, but at least gave Hibs a win on the night. Despite exiting the competition, the second leg match is still fondly remembered by Hibs supporters; Dougray Scott later named it as his favourite match.

Results

Scottish League Cup 
As one of the SPL clubs who qualified for European competition, Hibs entered at the last 16 stage (third round) of the competition, in which they defeated Raith Rovers 2–0. Another 2–0 win, against Dundee United at Easter Road, sent Hibs through to the semi-final. By the time the semi-final was played, Alex McLeish had departed and Franck Sauzee was now the manager. The shock 1–0 defeat by First Division club Ayr United in the semi-final was cited as one of the causes of Sauzee's dismissal later that month.

Results

Scottish Cup 
Hibs' brief Scottish Cup campaign during 2001–02 came during the period that Franck Sauzee was manager. It transpired that the victory in the third round replay against Stranraer, a Second Division club, was to be Sauzee's only win as Hibs manager. Hibs were heavily defeated by Rangers, now managed by Alex McLeish, in the last 16.

Results

Transfers 

Hibs broke their transfer record during the 2001 close season with the purchase of Ecuadorian international player Ulises de la Cruz, paying £700,000 for his services. Hibs manager Alex McLeish later claimed that the fee was "more like" £350,000.

Players In

Players Out

Loans In

Loans Out

Player stats 

During the 2001–02 season, Hibs used 32 different players in competitive games. The table below shows the number of appearances and goals scored by each player.

|}

See also
List of Hibernian F.C. seasons

References

External links 
Fixtures & Results, Hibernian F.C. official site
Hibernian 2001/2002 results and fixtures, Soccerbase

Hibernian F.C. seasons
Hibernian